Deipyrodes is a genus of beetles in the family Carabidae, containing the following species:

 Deipyrodes inops Baehr, 2005
 Deipyrodes palustris (Sloane, 1910)

References

Lebiinae